JT Tran or The Asian Playboy, is a dating coach and pickup artist as well as
dating advice columnist for LA Weekly and Baller Magazine. He is also the founder, CEO and lead instructor of a company that offers pickup artist called ABCs of Attraction courses to men.

Biography
After Tran attended one of the pick up artist Mystery's bootcamps, he began to develop his own methods of attraction, concentrating on developing his own holistic approach to the art of seduction.

Techniques
Tran introduced the concept of the ABCDEF structure which incorporates three main components, namely: thoughts, actions, and words. The concept teaches men how to develop their attitudes, change the manner of their dress, and convey sexuality while courting and dating women. Tran mainly teaches shy Asian men confidence and communication skills.

Media attention
Tran and his company have featured on the front pages of AsianWeek and Nguoi Viet Daily News, as well as other newspapers such as The Harvard Crimson where he was the featured guest speaker at the Harvard University event "Between the (Pickup) Lines", D Magazine, Hyphen Magazine and a featured interview with Yale Daily News.

In May 2011, he was featured in New York in an article about Asian-Americans who were able to fight the "bamboo ceiling".

Tran spoke at Yale for Master's Tea and was featured in The Yale Herald. In February 2012, Tran visited the Wharton School of Business at University of Pennsylvania to talk about various cultural issues and why he decided to become a "relationship guru".

In March 2012, Tran held a live interview with Juju Chang on ABC's Nightline, who compared him with the likes of Jeremy Lin, John Cho, Harry Shum, Jr., and Daniel Dae Kim. He talked about how he failed with the ladies in the past, mostly due to typical Asian stereotypes of having "good grades but poor social skills," yet he became successful later by "applying his systematic engineering skills to dating" and these are the skills he teaches men at ABCs of Attraction today. To prove that his methods work, the TV crew followed Tran during the lecture and later out into the field live and unstaged.

In Spring 2012, Tran made the cover of NU Asian Magazine, discussing his journey from an aerospace engineer to a pick-up artist. He was also featured in Verge Magazine.

Tran was also profiled by Channel News Asia in Singapore, the Huffington Post and Voice of America News TV in China, which followed JT Tran and his team on the entire bootcamp process. The Awl news reporter, Sharon Adarlo, who first criticized ABCs of Attraction's methods, joined in on a bootcamp and wrote on how her opinion had changed after the experience. In 2015, Tran and pickup artist Andrew Chen of ABCs of Attraction were featured on Al Jazeera America, in a segment titled "Are Pickup Artists Misogynists or Gentlemen?" where Tran was compared with other pickup artists.

In 2017, Tran's Reddit AMA about Asian women who won't date Asian men was featured on Next Shark.

In 2018, Resonate named Tran the World's #1 Asian Dating Coach.

On February 14, 2018, Playboy Magazine profiled Tran on how men of different nationalities learn masculinity. In October 2020, JT Tran was also mentioned in BBC as a dating coach. In November 2020, Stanford Daily mentioned Tran on how he supervised men to approach women.

References

External links
 JT Tran's Official Website - ABCs of Attraction

 
American columnists
American people of Vietnamese descent
Living people
Pickup artists
Year of birth missing (living people)